Quella is a Chilean village in the commune (Spanish: comuna) of Cauquenes in the Maule Region.

Population 

The population of Quella is approximately 350 inhabitants.

Populated places in Cauquenes Province